Houzz is an American website, online community and software for architecture; interior design and decorating; landscape design and home improvement. It was founded in 2009 and is based in Palo Alto, California.

History
Houzz was founded as an online platform in February 2009 by Adi Tatarko and her husband Alon Cohen, in response to the challenges they faced with their own home remodeling project. They found it difficult to communicate their vision for their home, and to find the right professionals for their project. Cohen coded the initial website himself, and they asked a few Bay Area architects to upload their portfolios, to give home renovators ideas for their projects. The site spread by word-of-mouth and they began to receive emails from homeowners and home professionals outside the Bay Area asking them to open more categories on Houzz and expand to other areas. Houzz became a company in the fall of 2010.

In November 2010, Houzz released an app for the iPad. The Android version of the app was released in December 2012.

In July 2013, Houzz introduced the Real Cost Finder, an interactive tool that helps users plan home renovations and total costs. The tool is based on data collected from the Houzz community.

In January 2014, Houzz announced that it had opened offices and hired local managers in the UK, Germany and Australia to accelerate its global expansion; 35% of the company's site traffic already came from outside the U.S. In February, Houzz launched Site Designer, a free website building and publishing tool for home professionals. In December, Houzz announced its expansion to the rest of Europe and into Asia, starting with Japan. It was reported that the Houzz database contained millions of images of home interiors and exteriors.

In May 2015, Houzz introduced HouzzTV, showing homeowners' projects using design professionals. In August, Houzz made its first acquisition, acquiring gardening and home advice site GardenWeb from NBCUniversal. In October, Houzz settled a privacy violation lawsuit for not providing the standard recorded notification that customers' and professionals' calls were being recorded for quality and training purposes.

In January 2016, Houzz introduced Sketch for Android. In February, Houzz introduced View in My Room within its app for iOS and Android that lets users virtually place products from the Houzz Marketplace in their homes before buying. In March, Houzz announced that it had opened its Commerce API to third party partners, to make it easier for merchants to sell and manage their inventory on Houzz. In May, Houzz won "Best App" at Google's inaugural Play Awards. In September, Houzz launched Visual Match, a tool that "uses deep learning technology to analyze more than 11 million home photos on Houzz. Furniture and decor that looks similar to the six million products on the Houzz Marketplace is then surfaced for users to browse (and hopefully buy)."

In May 2017, Houzz introduced a tool for its iPhone and iPad app, View in My Room 3D, that allows people to preview over 300,000 products in 3D within the context of their own rooms. In July, Sketch was made available as a web app. With the launch of iOS 11 from Apple in September, Houzz introduced an upgraded version of its 3D AR tool within its app for iPhone and iPad, with 500,000 products available to view. 

In February 2018, Houzz acquired IvyMark, a company that developed business management software and a community platform for interior designers and home design firms.  In March, the Houzz App for Android devices was updated with ARCore support, enabling users to "place virtual representations of furniture and other home decor items anywhere in their home to see how they would look."

As of June 2019, the company had reportedly 40 million users.

In April 2020, the company launched Houzz Pro software to help home professionals run their businesses. As of May, Houzz had over 20 million photos of design ideas on its platform.

By March 2021, the company reportedly had 2.7 million professionals in its professional services database.

Products and services 
Houzz offers a home design photo database with millions of images of home interiors and exteriors. Homeowners browse photos by room, style and location, and bookmark photos in personal collections the site calls ideabooks. Users can click on an image to learn more about the designer, ask a question, and learn about products tagged in the photos.

Houzz also has a directory of home improvement professionals who use the site to reach homeowners. The platform can be used for consumers to search through professionals for hire, view their previous projects, and ultimately hire them.

The company also develops Houzz Pro software, designed to help designers manage their projects, manage new business and handle their projects' financial details.

The company's HouzzTV video series shows homeowners' projects being implemented with the help of design professionals.

Reception
Bloomberg Businessweek called Houzz "An online antidote to the housing bust." Architectural Digest wrote about how the app would encourage imagination. TechCrunch wrote that the idea behind the company was well-executed. The Mercury News wrote about the breadth of ideas for customers and their architects to collaborate with. In 2012, The New York Times noted that the app was one of the few nongame apps on iOS that had a 5 star rating.

References

External links
 

Real estate companies established in 2009
Online marketplaces of the United States
Interior design
Architectural design
Internet properties established in 2009
Companies based in Palo Alto, California